The 2014 Mnet Asian Music Awards (MAMA) was held on December 3, 2014, at the AsiaWorld–Arena, Hong Kong. It marked its sixteenth edition acknowledging the past year's K-pop releases.

Nominees were announced on October 27, 2014. Leading the nominees was Exo with five. By the end of the ceremony, Exo received four awards, the most received awards of the night.

Background
This event marked the sixteenth Mnet Asian Music Awards. It was broadcast live in China, Japan, Hong Kong and Southeast Asia through various channels, as well as around the world.

The event took place in the same country and the same venue for the second consecutive time. This also marked the first time that the event organized a campaign called Girls' Education Campaign with CJ and UNESCO. It was also the first time that UnionPay sponsored the event exclusively.

Performers and presenters
The following individuals and groups, listed in order of appearance, presented awards or performed musical numbers.

Performers

Presenters

 Moon Hee-joon, Choi Yeo-jin, and Yura – red carpet hosts, presented Best Asian Style
 Song Seung-heon – main host of ceremony
 Ahn Jae-hyun and Park Min-woo – presented Best New Artist
 Yeon Woo-jin and Han Groo – presented Best Dance Performance – Solo
 Henry Lau – introduced presenters Gao Zi Qi and Chae Rim
 Gao Zi Qi and Chae Rim – presented Best Collaboration
 Mike He – presented the special award for Style in Music
 Lee Kwang-soo and Song Ji-hyo – presented Best Male Group and Best Female Group
 Tiffany of Girls' Generation – presented  John Legend
 Jeremy Lin via VTR – presented Favorite Music in China
 Jo Se-ho and Lee Kuk-ju – presented Best OST
 Yoon Jong-shin – Introduced performer IU
 South Korea President Park Geun-hye – Video greeting
 Eric Tsang and Park Bo-young – presented Best Vocal Performance – Male and Female
 Nam Joo-hyuk and Lee Jong-hyuk – presented Best Band Performance
 Alan Tam – introduced performer Kwak Jin-eon and presented the award for K-pop Fans' Choice – Male
 Yoon Jong-shin and Kang So-ra – presented Best Female Artist and Best Male Artist
 Forest Whitaker (via VTR) and Yoon Eun-hye – Talked about 'Bright Girls. Brighter Future!' UNESCO campaign
 Alan Tam and Yoon Eun-hye – presented Artist of the Year by country
 Kim Ji-suk – presented K-pop Fan's Choice – Female
 Lee Dong-wook and Yoo In-na – presented Best Dance Performance – Male and Female Group
 Oh Yeon-seo and Kim Ji-hoon – presented Best Rap Performance
 Jang Dong-min and Kyung Soo-jin – presented Best Music Video
 Song Seung-heon – presented the special award for The Most Popular Vocalist
 Kwon Sang-woo and Choi Ji-woo – presented Song of the Year
 Andy Lau – presented Album of the Year
 Song Seung-heon – Closing Remarks

Winners and nominees

Winners are listed first and highlighted in boldface.

Special Awards
 Best Asian Style: Exo
 International Favorite Artist: John Legend
 Style in Music: Jung Joon-young
 Favorite Music in China: Chopstick Brothers – "Little Apple"
 K-pop Fans' Choice – Male: Infinite
 K-pop Fan's Choice – Female: Girls' Generation-TTS
 Artist of the Year by country: Hồ Quỳnh Hương; Thaitanium; Raisa Andriana; JJ Lin; Leo Ieiri
The Most Popular Vocalist: IU

Multiple awards

Artist(s) with multiple wins
The following artist(s) received two or more wins (excluding the special awards):

Artist(s) with multiple nominations
The following artist(s) received more than two nominations:

G-Dragon's performance

G-Dragon became the subject of widespread attention following a rap performance prior to performing "Good Boy" with bandmate Taeyang. He raps: "It's been a year, MAMA. Because you set such a large table/awards, you hand it out generously so your children don't fight". Observers saw that the performance was meant to criticize the award committee for giving out awards to popular artists too easily, even when there are more technically qualified artists for the award.

The reception of the performance was mostly positive. CNN Indonesia wrote that "2014 became an unforgettable MAMA event for K-Pop fans, especially Big Bang fans" when "G-Dragon openly satirized the award ceremony on stage." In an article published by Yahoo! News Taiwan prior to the 2020 awards, an observer believed it to be one of the most legendary stages in MAMA history.

Notes

References

External links
 Mnet Asian Music Awards  official website

MAMA Awards ceremonies
Mnet
Mnet